Rabbi Pesach Wolicki (born 5 February 1970) is an educator, writer, columnist, lecturer, public speaker and pro-Israel activist. In previous positions, he served as the Rosh Yeshiva at Yeshivat Yesodei HaTorah from 2003 to 2015 and as the Associate Director of the Center for Jewish-Christian Understanding and Cooperation (CJCUC) from 2015 to 2019. He is a columnist for The Jerusalem Post,  The Times of Israel, Charisma News, and Breaking News Israel and is an outspoken figure in the world of Jewish-Christian interfaith relations.

Biography
Rabbi Pesach Wolicki was born in Ohio on February 5, 1970 to Marsha (née Dubow) and Rabbi Jerome B. Wolicki. During his early childhood years, he lived in Canada.

Education
Wolicki studied at Yeshivat Kerem B'Yavneh and later became a fellow at Darche Noam Kollel. He received his semicha (rabbinical ordination) from the Chief Rabbinate of Jerusalem.

Career

Wolicki served as a pulpit rabbi at Adath Jeshurun Orthodox synagogue in Virginia and as Development Director of Hillel Academy in Fairfield, Connecticut.

In 2003, he became Rosh Yeshiva of Yeshivat Yesodei HaTorah. In 2015, Rabbi Wolicki became the Associate Director for the Center for Jewish-Christian Understanding and Cooperation. He left this position in 2019.

In a September 2015 article for The Times of Israel Wolicki expounded his strong support of Rabbi Shlomo Riskin's global Day to Praise interfaith initiative fighting off claims of 'foreign fire' by the Haredi Jewish circles and citing, in regards to the initiative, that "While discomfort is understandable, we dare not assume that what is uncomfortable and new is therefore forbidden."

Blessing Bethlehem

In September 2016, Wolicki launched CJCUC's "Blessing Bethlehem" fundraising initiative at the LifeLight Festival in Sioux Falls, South Dakota in and effort to create a food giveaway program for persecuted Christians in Bethlehem.

Works
 Cup of Salvation (Center for Jewish-Christian Understanding and Cooperation, Gefen Publishing, 2017)

Personal life
In 1994, Wolicki made aliyah to Israel.

Wolicki resides with his wife and eight children in Bet Shemesh.

Further reading
 Center for Jewish-Christian Understanding and Cooperation
 Day to Praise
 Blessing Bethlehem

External links

References

1970 births
American emigrants to Canada
Canadian Orthodox rabbis
Canadian Zionists
Israeli Orthodox rabbis
Jewish American writers
Jewish Canadian writers
Living people
Rosh yeshivas
21st-century Israeli rabbis
Modern Orthodox rabbis
Canadian emigrants to Israel
Founders of charities
Bible commentators
Christian and Jewish interfaith dialogue
Old Testament scholars